Adjournment sine die (from Latin "without a day") is the conclusion of a meeting by a deliberative assembly, such as a legislature or organizational board, without setting a day to reconvene. The assembly can reconvene, either in its present form or a reconstituted form, if preexisting laws and rules provide for this. Otherwise the adjournment effectively dissolves the assembly.

A court may also adjourn a matter sine die, which means that the matter is stayed until further notice. In a sine die adjournment of this type, the hearing stands open indefinitely, and could theoretically be resumed if the situation changed. For example, a case may be adjourned sine die if there is no possibility of proceeding in the foreseeable future, such as when the defendant is in prison and cannot participate in legal proceedings.

United States usage
The Congress of the United States customarily adjourns a session sine die on the morning of January 3, immediately before the next session holds its constitutionally mandated first meeting. It can also adjourn sine die at other times through a concurrent resolution that allows the  Speaker of the House and Senate Majority Leader  to resume the session.

Some state legislatures mark adjournment sine die with a ceremony. In the Florida Legislature, the sergeants-at-arms of the Florida Senate and the Florida House of Representatives step outside their chambers each holding a handkerchief. When they meet in between the chambers, they both drop the handkerchiefs, signifying the end of the legislative session.

References

Latin legal terminology
Parliamentary procedure